The Supreme Court of Haiti is the highest court in the Haitian legal system. The Supreme Court building is located in Port-au-Prince.

History

From 1806–1817, the Senate of Haiti served judicial functions. The Supreme Court was first formed in 1817 under Petion's 1816 constitution as a body of a grand judge, dean, six judges and a government commissioner, all of whom were to be appointed for life. The first Grand Judge of the Supreme Court was André Dominique Sabourin, who concurrently served as Minister of Justice in Petion's cabinet. Other appointees to the court were:

 Louis Germain Linard, dean
 Jacques Ignace Fresnel
 Jean Thézan, 
 Jean-François Lespinasse, 
 Thomas Gédeon Christ (who was sworn in later),
 Lemerand
 Pitre Jeune
 Louis-Gabriel Audigé, Government Commissioner

Jules Solime Milscent was also appointed as the first clerk.

The Law of 16 July 1954 added a Judge to the eleven provided by the Law of 1918 and since then, the Court of Cassation of Haiti is composed of twelve Judges (including the President and Vice-President), a Government Commissioner, and three substitutes.

Composition
The Constitution of Haiti stipulates that Supreme Court justices are appointed by the president from a list submitted by the senate of three persons per court seat. It is unclear whether they are appointed for 10 years (Art. 174 says so) or for life (Art. 177 says so).

Historically the court has frequently reversed its own opinions and its justices have often been replaced. Almost all new governments have a Supreme Court of their own choosing. For example, in February 2021, President Jovenel Moise declared judges, Joseph Mécène Jean-Louis, Yvickel Dabrezil, and Wendelle Coq Thelot retired after the opposition had tried to replace Moises with Jean-Louis as president.

Role
The Supreme Court of Haiti interprets and expounds all congressional enactments brought to it in cases, and as such it interprets state law. It also has superseding power over all courts to examine departmental and federal statutes and executive actions, determining whether they conform to the country's Constitution. The Labor Courts and the Land Court are only appealable to the Supreme Court, as opposed to the Juvenile Court and the High Court of Accounts.

If the constitutionality of a law, statute, or an executive action is ruled against by the Supreme Court, its decision can be overcome if the Constitution is amended by the people parliaments or if the Court overrules itself. Decisions by the Court do not pertain to specific cases, rather are intended to encompass interpretation of legislature and executive authority, actually developing the way laws are interpreted. The Cour de Cassation therefore potentially yields the highest power in the Haiti governmental system.

Under the 1987 constitution, the line of succession to the office of President of Haiti went first to the president of the Supreme Court, then to the vice-president of the court, then to judges in order of seniority. An election for president was required within three months and the acting president could not run for the office. This was amended in 2011-2012 to remove all judges from the presidential line of succession.

Palais de Justice
The Palais de Justice (the Supreme Court building) was heavily damaged and partially collapsed as a result of the 2010 Haiti earthquake.

Chief Justices of the Supreme Court

Current members
 Jean Joseph Lebrun, President (since 2022)
 Jean-Claude Théogène, vice-president (since 2019)
 Barthélemy Anténor (since 2019)
 Jean-Joseph Lebrun (since 2019)

References

Politics of Haiti
Haiti
Buildings and structures in Port-au-Prince
Government buildings in Haiti
1817 establishments in Haiti